Åsele Municipality is a municipality in Västerbotten County in northern Sweden. Its seat is located in the town of Åsele. It is located in the southernmost fringe of Lapland.

History
The first Swedish settlement in Åsele Municipality (it was already inhabited by the native Sami people) was in Gafsele south of Åsele. The settlers were Nils Andersson and his wife Brita. They came from Finland in 1674, trying to avoid the war with Russia.

Fredrika is a parish in the municipality. It was created in 1799 and named in honour of Queen Frederica Dorothea Wilhelmina of Sweden. Other nearby parishes were named Dorotea and Vilhelmina, but Åsele refused to take any of these names, as they were proud of themselves and the town.

In 1974 the former market town (köping) Åsele (1959-1970) was amalgamated with Dorotea and Fredrika. In 1980 the Dorotea part was detached, forming a new Dorotea Municipality.

Geography

Geographically, the Ångerman River flows from Vilhelmina through Åsele Municipality, and many electric power stations are built around it.

The town Åsele is located in the middle of the municipality. It has a wooden church, a small historical (open-air) museum, and a nine-hole golf course.

Localities
There are two localities (or urban areas) in Åsele Municipality:

The municipal seat in bold

Elections

Riksdag
These are the results of the elections to the Riksdag for Åsele Municipality since the 1972 municipal reform. SCB did not publish the party's results for the Sweden Democrats between 1988 and 1998 because of the party's small size nationally.

Blocs

This lists the relative strength of the socialist and centre-right blocs since 1973, but parties not elected to the Riksdag are inserted as "other", including the Sweden Democrats results from 1988 to 2006, but also the Christian Democrats pre-1991 and the Greens in 1982, 1985 and 1991. The sources are identical to the table above. The coalition or government mandate marked in bold formed the government after the election. New Democracy got elected in 1991 but are still listed as "other" due to the short lifespan of the party.

Other
The municipality has recently received some recognition as the future site of Europe's largest Thai Buddhist temple.

References

External links

Åsele Municipality - Official site 

Municipalities of Västerbotten County